Arthur Gilbert Trudeau (July 5, 1902 – June 5, 1991) was a lieutenant general in the United States Army. He is best known for his command of the 7th Infantry Division during the Battle of Pork Chop Hill in the Korean War.

Early life and education
Trudeau was born in Middlebury, Vermont, on July 5, 1902, and entered the United States Military Academy at West Point in 1920. He graduated in the Class of 1924 and later served in the 104th Engineers of the New Jersey National Guard.

Career

In 1944, Trudeau was promoted to brigadier general. Considered a specialist in amphibious warfare as the prior chief of staff of the Engineer Amphibian Command, he assumed command of a secret base in the Philippines in 1945, assisting in the preparation for an invasion of Japan that never happened.

In January 1946, Trudeau was appointed as a judge at the military tribunal of Gen. Masaharu Homma in view of the war crimes committed by his command during the invasion of the Philippines, sitting on the bench along with Major General Leo Donovan, Major General Basilio Valdes, Brig. Gen. Robert G. Gard, and Brig. Gen. Warren H. McNaught.

After the war, he served in Germany, before becoming deputy commander of the United States Army War College in 1950.

During the Korean War, Trudeau commanded the 7th Infantry Division. He received the Silver Star by personally leading a reconnaissance team to scout a strategic position, Pork Chop Hill, while it was under heavy enemy fire. He was named chief of army intelligence in October 1953, but was relieved of his command 20 months later when Allen W. Dulles, Director of Central Intelligence, sent a scathing memorandum of complaints to the Pentagon. Although the contents of the memorandum were not made public, Trudeau was noted for his vigorous anti-Communist statements, and he often clashed with other government officials over their differing views of communist intentions. He returned to Korea to take command of I Corps. On October 18, 1956, Trudeau was promoted to lieutenant general. In 1958, he returned to Washington as director of Army research and development.

Later life and death
Upon retirement from the army in 1962, Trudeau went on to head Gulf Labs of the Gulf Oil Corporation in Pittsburgh until 1968. He then served as a special adviser to the chairman of Pittsburgh's Rockwell International aerospace firm until 1972.

Throughout his military service, Trudeau was an outspoken advocate of racial integration of the military. He also said it was in the nation's best interests that educational opportunities be provided for the disadvantaged so they could take advantage of new career openings. Trudeau is a member of the Military Intelligence Hall of Fame.

Trudeau died on May 5, 1991, in Chevy Chase, Maryland, and was buried at Arlington National Cemetery.

Awards and decorations
 Distinguished Service Medal with two oak leaf clusters
 Silver Star with oak leaf cluster
 Legion of Merit
 Bronze Star Medal
 Air Medal
 Philippine Liberation Medal
 Commander of the Order of Leopold II
 Order of Boyacá
 Order of the Rising Sun
 Knight Commander of the Order of the Sword
 United Nations Medal

References

External links

Arthur Trudeau's FBI files, hosted at the Internet Archive:
Part 1
Part 1A
Part 2
Arlington National Cemetery
Generals of World War II

United States Army generals
1902 births
1991 deaths
United States Army personnel of the Korean War
United States Military Academy alumni
United States Army War College alumni
People from Middlebury, Vermont
Military personnel from Vermont
New Jersey National Guard personnel
Recipients of the Silver Star
Recipients of the Distinguished Service Medal (US Army)
Articles containing video clips
United States Army generals of World War II
Burials at Arlington National Cemetery
Commanders of the Order of Leopold II
Recipients of the Air Medal
Recipients of the Legion of Merit
Recipients of the Order of the Rising Sun
Recipients of the Order of the Sword